was a town located in Shiranuka District, Kushiro Subprefecture, Hokkaido, Japan.

As of September 30, 2004, it had an estimated population of 2,821 and an area of 401.40 km2.

On October 11, 2005, Onbetsu, along with the town of Akan (from Akan District) was merged into the expanded city of Kushiro.

Onbetsu is the location of the Onbetsu Power Station, a diesel-powered facility.

History 
1919 - Established as a village
1922 - Renamed to Onbetsu Village
1959 - Becomes Onbetsu Town
October 11, 2005 - Onbetsu was merged into the expanded Kushiro City

External links
 Onbetsu official website 

Dissolved municipalities of Hokkaido
Kushiro, Hokkaido